Valladolid (Saki in Maya) is a city located in the eastern region of the  Mexican state of Yucatán. It is the seat of Valladolid Municipality. 

As of the 2020 census the population of the city was 56,494 inhabitants (the third-largest community in the state after Kanasín), and that of the municipality was 85,460. 

The municipality has an areal extent of 945.22 km2 (364.95 sq mi) and includes many outlying communities, the largest of which are Popolá, Kanxoc, Yalcobá, and Xocén. 

Valladolid is located approximately 170 km (105 mi) east of the state capital Mérida, 40 km (25 mi) east of Chichén Itzá, and 150 km (93 mi) west of Cancún. 

On August 30, 2012, Valladolid became part of the Pueblo Mágico promotional initiative led by the Mexican tourism department.

History
Named after Valladolid, at the time the capital of Spain. The name derives from the Arabic name Balad al-Walid بلد الوليد, which means "city of al-Walid", referring to Al-Walid I. Valladolid in Yucatán was established by Spanish Conquistador Francisco de Montejo's nephew on May 27, 1543 at some distance from the current town, at a lagoon called Chouac-Ha in the municipality of Tizimín. However, early Spanish settlers complained about the mosquitos and humidity at the original location, and petitioned to have the city moved further inland.

On March 24, 1545, Valladolid was relocated to its current location, built atop a Mayan town called Zací or Zací-Val, whose buildings were dismantled to reuse the stones to build the Spanish colonial town. The following year the Maya people revolted, but the rebellion was suppressed with the support of additional Spanish troops from Mérida.

In 1705 there was a revolt by local Maya; the rebels killed a number of town officials who had taken refuge in the cathedral. When the revolt was suppressed, the cathedral was considered irreparably profaned, and was demolished. A new cathedral was built the following year that still exists; it was oriented to face north unlike most other Colonial churches in Yucatan which face east.

Valladolid had a population of 15,000 in 1840. In January 1847, the native Mayas rioted, killing some eighty whites and sacking their houses. After a Maya noble was shot by firing squad, the riot became a general uprising. It was led by Jacinto Pat, batab of Tihosuco and by Cecilio Chi of nearby Ichmul. The city and the surrounding region was the scene of intense battle during Yucatán's Caste War, and the Ladino forces were forced to abandon Valladolid on March 14, 1848, with half being killed by ambush before they reached Mérida. The city was sacked by the Maya rebels but was recaptured later in the war.

Until the beginning of the 20th century, Valladolid was the third largest and most important city of the Yucatán Peninsula, (after Mérida and Campeche). It had a sizable well-to-do Criollo population, with a number of old Spanish style mansions in the old city. Valladolid was widely known by its nickname The Sultana of the East.

Sights

Valladolid is a popular city in which to explore the history and culture of the Yucatán Peninsula. Notable sights include the colonial-era ex-convent and church Convent of San Bernardino de Siena (named after saint Bernardino of Siena), which was built by Franciscan missionaries between 1552 and 1560 in the Sisal neighbourhood. In downtown Valladolid is the Cathedral of San Servacio (named after Saint Servatius), located in the main square of the city. The center of the city's grid-like road structure features a plaza — Parque Principal Francisco Cantón Rosado — surrounded by restaurants and shops. Located close to the heart of the city is the Cenote Zací, a landscaped freshwater cenote or underground sinkhole in which visitors can explore and swim. There is also a restaurant on the premises of the Cenote Zací and artisans selling handcrafts. Valladolid is a popular base for visiting nearby major Mayan ruins such as Chichén Itzá and Ekʼ Balam, as well as Cenote Ik Kil. Many principal sites are marked with bilingual signage to make them more hospitable for English-speaking tourists.

Gastronomy
The typical dish of the region is Lomitos de Valladolid which is a pork dish in fresh tomato sauce; Cochinita pibil meat marinated in achiote, and spices, wrapped in banana leaf and barbecued or baked in a pit; lechon al horno, bistek de cazuela, relleno negro which is turkey cooked with a paste of charred chillies and vegetables with bits of hard-boiled eggs, frijol con puerco and chicken in escabeche.  Valladolid is also known for its longaniza which are a type of pork-based salami sausage with traditional condiments. Local traditional candies are based on materials from the region such as honey, coconut, corn and others. Traditional ice cream is also very popular. The most common flavours are coconut, corn and fruits of the region as guanabana, mamey sapote and others.

Climate
The climate in the Yucatán Peninsula is hot and dry. There is also tropical rain with hot and predominate trade winds most times of the year. Valladolid features a tropical wet and dry climate. The city lies in the trade wind belt close to the Tropic of Cancer, with the prevailing wind from the east. Valladolid's climate is hot and humidity is moderate to high, depending on the time of year. The average annual high temperature is 33 °C (91 °F), ranging from 28 °C (82 °F) in January to 36 °C (97 °F) in May, but temperatures often rise above 38 °C (100 °F) in the afternoon in this time. Low temperatures range between 18 °C (64 °F) in January to 23 °C (73 °F) in May and June. It is most often a few degrees hotter in Valladolid than coastal areas due to its inland location and low elevation. The rainy season runs from June through October, associated with the Mexican monsoon which draws warm, moist air landward. Easterly waves and tropical storms also affect the area during this season.

Transportation
Valladolid has a structured road service which makes it easy to travel around. Travellers driving through the Yucatán Peninsula have the option of taking the federal road or the toll route and both roads go through Valladolid. In the city there are taxi services at reasonable rates and public transportation which is popular for students and locals but not recommended for tourists. There is an Autobuses de Oriente bus terminal situated in the heart of the city which serves to the travellers going to all major cities in the Yucatán Peninsula, such as Mérida, Cancún, Playa del Carmen, and Tulum as well as archaeological sites such as Chichén Itzá, Cobá, and Ekʼ Balam.

Gallery

References

Link to tables of population data from Census of 2005 INEGI: Instituto Nacional de Estadística, Geografía e Informática
Yucatán Enciclopedia de los Municipios de México

Notes

External links

 Valladolid Photo Essay

Populated places in Yucatán
Populated places established in 1543
Tourism in Mexico
Pueblos Mágicos
1543 establishments in New Spain